Ti-6Al-4V (UNS designation R56400), also sometimes called TC4, Ti64, or ASTM Grade 5, is an alpha-beta titanium alloy with a high specific strength and excellent corrosion resistance. It is one of the most commonly used titanium alloys and is applied in a wide range of applications where low density and excellent corrosion resistance are necessary such as e.g. aerospace industry and biomechanical applications (implants and prostheses).

Studies of titanium alloys used in armors began in the 1950s at the Watertown Arsenal, which later became a part of the Army Research Laboratory.

Increased use of titanium alloys as biomaterials is occurring due to their lower modulus, superior biocompatibility and enhanced corrosion resistance when compared to more conventional stainless steels and cobalt-based alloys. These attractive properties were a driving force for the early introduction of a (cpTi) and a#b (Ti—6Al—4V) alloys as well as for the more recent development of new Ti-alloy compositions and orthopaedic metastable b titanium alloys. The latter possess enhanced biocompatibility, reduced elastic modulus, and superior strain-controlled and notch fatigue resistance.  However, the poor shear strength and wear resistance of titanium alloys have nevertheless limited their biomedical use. Although the wear resistance of b-Ti alloys has shown some improvement when compared to a#b alloys, the ultimate utility of orthopaedic titanium alloys as wear components will require a more complete fundamental understanding of the wear mechanisms involved.

Chemistry
(in wt. %)

Physical and Mechanical Properties

Ti-6Al-4V titanium alloy commonly exists in alpha, with hcp crystal structure, (SG : P63/mmc) and beta, with bcc crystal structure, (SG : Im-3m) phases. While mechanical properties are a function of the heat treatment condition of the alloy and can vary based upon properties, typical property ranges for well-processed Ti-6Al-4V are shown below. Aluminum stabilizes the alpha phase, while vanadium stabilizes the beta phase.

Ti-6Al-4V has a very low thermal conductivity at room temperature, 6.7 - 7.5 W/m·K, which contributes to its relatively poor machinability.

The alloy is considered as having little or no sensitivity to cold dwell fatigue.

Heat Treatment of Ti-6Al-4V 

The microstructure will vary significantly depending on the exact heat treatment and method of processing. Three common heat treatment processes are mill annealing, duplex annealing, and solution treating and aging.

Applications
 Implants and prostheses (wrought, cast or by Additive Manufacturing (AM))
 Additive Manufacturing
 Parts and prototypes for racing and aerospace industry. Used extensively within the Boeing 787 aircraft.
 Marine applications
 Chemical industry
 Gas turbines
 Firearm Suppressors

Specifications
 UNS: R56400
 AMS Standard: 4928
 ASTM Standard: F1472
 ASTM Standard: B265 Grade 5

References

Titanium alloys